José Omar Sandoval Barthelemiez (born 14 July 1955), known as Omar Sandoval, is a Chilean former professional footballer who played as a defender for clubs in Chile and Mexico.

Club career
A product of Universidad Católica youth system, Sandoval coincided with players such as Nelson Sanhueza, Mario Maldonado, Jorge Aravena and Gustavo Moscoso. In the 1977 season, he made fourteen appearances.

He also played on loan at O'Higgins in the 1976 season, getting promotion to the Chilean Primera División.

He came to Mexico at the age of twenty two and played for Cruz Azul and Tecos. With Tecos, they faced New York Cosmos, where played Franz Beckenbauer and made a tour in Europe, winning a friendly tournament where also took part the Republic of Ireland national team and the Spanish club Levante, becoming the first Mexican club to win a tournament in that continent. In the same club, he coincided with players such his compatriot Mario Maldonado and the Brazilian Geraldo Cândido.

Coaching career
In November 2001, he assumed as coach of Tecos in the 2001 Torneo Invierno, where he coached his compatriot Reinaldo Navia. On 27 January 2002, he left the club after three consecutive losses.

He also has worked as football coach at university level at the National Autonomous University of Mexico.

Personal life
His son, Daniel Sandoval Martins, played for Tecos, when Omar was the coach.

He made his home in Guadalajara, Mexico, and became a business owner in activities such as trade of clothes and automotive services.

References

External links
 
 

1955 births
Living people
Footballers from Santiago
Chilean footballers
Chilean expatriate footballers
Chilean Primera División players
Club Deportivo Universidad Católica footballers
Primera B de Chile players
O'Higgins F.C. footballers
Liga MX players
Cruz Azul footballers
Tecos F.C. footballers
Chilean expatriate sportspeople in Mexico
Expatriate footballers in Mexico
Association football defenders
Chilean football managers
Chilean expatriate football managers
Tecos F.C. managers
Liga MX managers
Expatriate football managers in Mexico